"Walk, Don't Run" is an instrumental composition written and originally recorded by jazz guitarist Johnny Smith in 1954.

It was later adapted and re-recorded by Chet Atkins in 1956, and was a track on the LP Hi-Fi In Focus. This arrangement was the inspiration for the version by The Ventures in 1960 (though the Ventures' arrangement is recognizably different from Atkins' finger-picked style) and achieved world-wide recognition, being regarded by Rolling Stone magazine as one of the 100 Greatest Guitar Songs of All Time.

The Ventures recording

After hearing a Chet Atkins recording of "Walk, Don't Run", the Tacoma-based instrumental rock band The Ventures released their version of the tune as a single in spring 1960 on Dolton Records. This version made the Billboard Hot 100 chart, peaking at number 2 and kept out of the number 1 spot by "It's Now or Never" by Elvis Presley. "Walk, Don't Run" also made the US Hot R&B Sides chart, where it went to number 13. The instrumental reached number 3 on the Cash Box magazine chart for five weeks in August and September 1960. In Canada, the song reached #1 on August 29, 1960. The Dolton release of this record had two backing sides, the first release (Dolton 25) had "Home", and after initial sales were so great, the B-side was replaced with a Bogle–Wilson original composition, "The McCoy" (Dolton 25-X), to gain royalties.

Personnel on this record were Bob Bogle – lead guitar, Don Wilson – rhythm guitar, Nokie Edwards – bass, and Skip Moore – drums. It was recorded and engineered by Joe Boles, who had a basement studio in his home in Seattle, Washington. He also engineered the band's first two albums. This version of the song follows the musical structure known as the Andalusian cadence, which originated from Flamenco, although the Ventures' version replaces the vi chord (relative to C major) with a VI chord, A major.

This single, the Ventures' first national release, became a huge hit and vaulted the group to stardom. The song was recorded before the band officially had a drummer. The Ventures' website lists the drummer on "Walk, Don't Run" as Skip Moore. Moore was not interested in touring and never was a full-time member of the band. As payment for his session work, Moore was given the choice of $25 or 25% of any royalties from sales of the single. He took the $25.  Bob Bogle played the lead guitar part on this first Ventures recording of the song. The band later rerecorded the song in 1964 (see below), and became the first band to score two top ten hits with two versions of the same tune.

"Walk, Don't Run" was included on the compilation album 15 Hits: The Original Recordings released by Liberty Records in 1962. And in 1991 the song was included on the compilation CD 24 Greatest Hits of All Time in the EMI Legends of Rock n' Roll Series.

In the UK, the tune was covered by the John Barry Seven, whose version, while only peaking at number 11 on the Record Retailer chart, compared to the Ventures' number 8, outcharted them by reaching the Top 10 on other UK charts, such as that of the NME.

In July 2003, the tune was recorded by Ventures guitarist Nokie Edwards and the Light Crust Doughboys for the album Guitars Over Texas. This version is known for its jazz-inflected second verse and the use of keyboards in place of rhythm guitar.

Critical reception
Rolling Stone magazine rated the Ventures' version of "Walk, Don't Run" as number 82 on their list of the 100 Greatest Guitar Songs of All Time.

Walk, Don't Run '64

"Walk, Don't Run '64" is an updated The Ventures recording that features a guitar style more similar to that of "Misirlou", and is notable for starting with a "fade-in" (as opposed to many songs of the era that ended with a "fade out"). In this version, the lead guitarist and bass player from the original switched roles, with Edwards handling the lead parts and Bogle the bass. It reached number 8 on the Billboard Hot 100 chart, and number 9 on the Cash Box chart in 1964. In Canada, the song reached #24.

The B-side, "The Cruel Sea", was a version of the Dakotas' 1963 single. Both recordings featured Nokie Edwards playing the lead guitar part.

The recording was used in 2000 for the dancing scene in the Australian movie The Goddess of 1967 by Clara Law.

Johnny Smith
"Walk, Don't Run" was written by Smith in 1954, who was inspired by the song "Softly, as in a Morning Sunrise" by Romberg and Hammerstein. 
Smith, a jazz musician who had backed singers such as Patrice Munsel performing the song, composed "Walk, Don't Run" as a contrafact, using the chord progression from "Softly..." as the basis for his melody, which he keyed in D minor.
Smith included the piece on his 1954 album In A Sentimental Mood using a title chosen by his producer, Teddy Reig. It was also on Smith's 1956 album, Moods.

In 1967, Johnny Smith recorded a new and more up-tempo arrangement with Hank Jones, George Duvivier, and Don Lamond on his album Johnny Smith's Kaleidoscope.

In 1998 Smith was awarded the James Smithson Bicentennial Medal for his contribution to music; the citation singled out “the genesis of 'Walk, Don't Run',” as well as “his manifold accomplishments” and their “profound and pervasive influence on the role of the guitar in contemporary popular culture.”

Chet Atkins
In 1957 Chet Atkins recorded a popular rendition of the song for his album Hi-Fi in Focus. He did so after discussing the matter with Smith, who was pleased with the arrangement. Atkins played his arrangement in A minor, using fingerstyle and including the bass notes A,G,F, and E. This later became the basis for the Ventures' arrangement. Other cover versions include those by the Shadows, Agent Orange, Zapatón, Steve Howe, Glen Campbell, Herb Alpert and the Tijuana Brass, Tommy Leonetti, and the Penguin Cafe Orchestra.

Selected recorded versions
 1954: Johnny Smith
 1957: Chet Atkins
 1960: The Ventures
 1960: The John Barry Seven (featuring Vic Flick on guitar)
 1960: Les Fantômes
 1963: Bijele Strijele
 1963: Count Basie (arraigned by Quincy Jones) 
 1964: Tommy Leonetti (with new lyrics written by Dottie Faye)
 1965: Glen Campbell
 1965: Herb Alpert and the Tijuana Brass
 1967: Johnny Smith
 1971: Led Zeppelin　Live in Los Angeles, CA（The Ventures version）
 1972: Pink Fairies
 1973: Sha Na Na
 1974: Mike Auldridge
 1977: The Shadows
 1981: The Penguin Cafe Orchestra
 1983: JFA (band) (Jodie Foster's Army)
 1984: Kazumi Watanabe
 1992: Those Darn Accordions, performed entirely on accordions
 1993: California Guitar Trio
 1994: Jeff Beck Little Big League soundtrack（The Ventures version）
 1998: Steve Howe
 1999: Johnny A.
 2003: Nokie Edwards and the Light Crust Doughboys
 2004: Terrafolk (as a medley featuring also "Music for a Found Harmonium")

Appearances in feature length films
 1988: Aloha Summer
 1988: Crocodile Dundee II
 1993: Wayne's World 2
 1993: Matinee
 1999: American Pie 2000: The Goddess of 1967 2010: Flipped 2014: Pawn SacrificeSee also
List of jazz contrafacts

References

External links
 Walk, Don't Run  Documentary produced by Full Focus''

1954 songs
1960 singles
The Ventures songs
Glen Campbell songs
Instrumentals
Surf music
1964 singles
Rock instrumentals
1960s instrumentals
Surf instrumentals